Hailey Rosanne Hernandez (born March 23, 2003) is a female diver from the United States.

Personal life 
Hernandez graduated from Southlake Carroll High School in 2021 and will attend the University of Texas, where she plans to major in biology.

Diving 
Hernandez started diving at age seven. She is a four-time Texas 6A high school state champion and a two-time world junior medalist.

She qualified for the 2020 Olympics in the women's 3 meter springboard, placing second behind Krysta Palmer. Her dives had the lowest degree of difficulty among the Olympic contenders, although she made up for it by being the most consistent performing diver in the meet.

References

American female divers
Living people
Place of birth missing (living people)
2003 births
Olympic divers of the United States
People from Southlake, Texas
Divers at the 2020 Summer Olympics
Sportspeople from the Dallas–Fort Worth metroplex
21st-century American women